The CME Group Tour Championship is a women's professional golf tournament, the season-ending event of the LPGA Tour. It succeeded the LPGA Tour Championship, which was played for two seasons in 2009 and 2010. From 2011 to 2013 the tournament was called the CME Group Titleholders. The tournament has a limited field of 60 players.

In 2014 the LPGA Tour introduced a season-long points race, the Race to the CME Globe, and a $1 million bonus. The CME Group Tour Championship marked the end of this season-long "Race". Each player's season-long "Race to the CME Globe" points were "reset" before the tournament based on their position in the points list. "Championship points" were then awarded to the top 40 players in the CME Group Tour Championship which were added to their "reset points" to determine the overall winner of the "Race to the CME Globe".

The title sponsor is the CME Group, a global derivatives marketplace based in Chicago. LPGA Commissioner Michael Whan announced on March 7, 2011, that CME had signed a three-year contract to sponsor the tournament. CME had previous experience hosting pro-am events with LPGA players.

The first tournament was played in November 2011 at Grand Cypress Golf Club in Orlando, Florida, which had hosted the 2010 LPGA Tour Championship. In 2012, the tournament moved to the Eagle Course of the TwinEagles Club, in Naples, Florida. Since 2013, it has been played in Naples at the Gold Course of the Tiburón Golf Club.

The 2011 winner earned $500,000, a full one-third of the $1.5 million purse. The first-place money was the second highest in women's golf, exceeded only by the U.S. Women's Open. Most events on the LPGA Tour have a standard schedule for distribution of the purse, with a winner's share of 15%. The 2010 LPGA Tour Championship had the same purse of $1.5 million, with a winner's share of $225,000 but it was a 120-player event rather than the limited field of the 2011 event. The purse was raised to $2 million in 2013, with a 35% winner's share of $700,000, the highest of the year. For 2014 the purse was maintained at $2 million but, with the introduction of the "Race to the CME Globe", the winner's share was reduced to one-quarter at $500,000, second only to the U.S. Women's Open. In 2019, the purse increased to $5 million with $1.5 million going to the winner, the largest winner's share in women's golf. 

They announced on November 17, 2021, that the 2022 Championship purse will again increase, to a record $7 million, with $2 million to the winner, the largest ever for an LPGA tournament. The minimum pay for any of the 60 entrants will be $40,000.

Tournament names
2011–2013: CME Group Titleholders
2014–present:  CME Group Tour Championship

Winners

Race to the CME Globe winners

Tournament record

See also
 ADT Championship

References

External links

Coverage on LPGA Tour's official site
Tiburón Golf Club − official site
TwinEagles Club − (2012 host)
Grand Cypress Golf Club − (2011 host)

 
LPGA Tour events
Golf in Florida
2011 establishments in Florida
Recurring sporting events established in 2011